Emmanuel Kodjoe Dadzie (16 March 1916 – March 1983) was a Ghanaian diplomat.

Early years and education
His secondary education was at Achimota School in Accra and his tertiary education at King's College London.

Career
He was a member of Lincoln's Inn and a barrister in London.
He served in the Gold Coast Civil Service from 1936 to 1942.
From 1942 to 1947, he was employed by the Royal Air Force of Britain.

From 1951 to 1959 Dadzie was in private legal practice in Accra. In 1959 he headed the legal service and consular service of the Ministry of Foreign Affairs. He was made Ghana's ambassador to Romania in Bucharest from 1962 to 1966.
From 1963 to 1966 he was resident representative of Ghana before the International Atomic Energy Agency in Vienna.
From 1965 to 1967 he was Ghana's Ambassador to France in Paris and Permanent Representative to Unesco.
In 1968 he was Ambassador to the Ministry of Foreign Affairs in Accra.
In 1969 he was Ghana's ambassador to Russia in Moscow.
In 1970 he was Director of the Policy Planning Division of the Ministry of Foreign Affairs.
In 1971 he was the main secretary, Ministry of Foreign Affairs.
From 1972 to 1977 he was Director of Protection at the United Nations High Commissioner for Refugees in Geneva.
From 1977 to 1982 he was elected member of the International Law Commission.

Personal life
In 1962 Dadzie married Theresa Striggner, with whom he had a daughter. His second marriage was to Irma La Rose. He had three daughters and two sons, his second daughter being Stella Dadzie, a well known feminist writer and education activist in the UK.

References

1916 births
1983 deaths
Alumni of Achimota School
Alumni of King's College London
Ambassadors of Ghana to France
Ambassadors of Ghana to Romania
Ambassadors of Ghana to Russia
Members of Lincoln's Inn
Ghanaian diplomats